The 1997 FIA GT Silverstone 4 Hours was the second race of the 1997 FIA GT Championship season.  It was run at the Silverstone Circuit, United Kingdom on May 11, 1997.

This race was scheduled for four hours, but was stopped shortly after three due to heavy rainfall.

Official results
Class winners in bold.  Cars failing to complete 75% of winner's distance marked as Not Classified (NC).

Statistics
 Pole Position – #11 AMG-Mercedes – 1:41.193
 Fastest Lap – #18 Schübel Engineering – 1:45.946
 Distance – 447.201 km
 Average Speed – 133.859 km/h

External links
 World Sports Prototype Racing – Race Results

S
Silverstone 4 Hours
FIA GT Silverstone 4 Hours